Emitt Lynn Rhodes (February 25, 1950 – July 19, 2020) was an American singer-songwriter, multi-instrumentalist and recording engineer. At 14 years, Rhodes began his career in musical ensembles the Palace Guard as the group's drummer before joining the Merry-Go-Round as a multi-instrumentalist. He has been called the "One-Man Beatles" due to the style and skill of his songwriting and instrumentation.

As a member of the Merry-Go-Round, Rhodes wrote or co-wrote eleven of the twelve songs on the band's eponymous first and only album, released in 1967. Over the next two years, Rhodes wrote and recorded several songs in order to fulfill a contractual obligation the band had with A&M Records. Following the band's dissolution, those songs were released as the album The American Dream (1970), an album credited to Rhodes but released without his input.

Rhodes' debut solo album is generally considered to be his self-titled 1970 release, which he recorded in his home studio. He went on to record and release two more solo albums, Mirror (1971) and Farewell to Paradise (1973). His career ended in 1973 because of a trial with his label.

Silent for 43 years, he was a cult figure of psychedelic pop music when he released his last album, Rainbow Ends, in 2016.

Recording career
Emitt Rhodes was born on February 25, 1950, in Decatur, Illinois. In 1955 his parents moved to Hawthorne, California. He began his musical career in 1964 at age 14 years as the drummer of the band the Palace Guard in Los Angeles. He left the band in 1966.

In Summer 1966 he created the band the Merry-Go-Round with three friends. He played guitar and wrote the lyrics. In 1967 their only album was released. Their first single "Live" reached number 63 on the Billboard Hot 100.

The Merry-Go-Round had a recording contract with A&M Records when the group disbanded in 1969.  Rhodes recorded songs at A&M to fulfill that contract, but A&M decided to not release them at the time. (They were later released as the album The American Dream.) Rhodes then decided to go out on his own and bought equipment to make a recording studio in his parents' garage.  Rhodes recorded his first album, Emitt Rhodes, in that home studio.  He got a recording contract with ABC/Dunhill Records, which released his album as well as the next two albums he recorded (Mirror and Farewell to Paradise).  Rhodes got a $5,000 advance for Emitt Rhodes, which he spent on recording equipment.

His first album was a critical success – Billboard called Rhodes "one of the finest artists on the music scene today" and later called his first album one of the "best albums of the decade". The album reached number 29 on the Billboard charts. The single "Fresh as a Daisy" reached number 54 on the pop chart. Rhodes opened at the Troubadour nightclub on February 9, 1971, concurrent with a large earthquake that struck the Los Angeles area. An ad that ran in Billboard said "That wasn't an earthquake, that was Emitt Rhodes opening at the Troubadour!" Meanwhile, shortly after Emitt Rhodes was released by Dunhill, A&M decided to release their old recordings of The American Dream, which confused record buyers. Mirror was released in 1971 and did reach the top 200 on Billboards album chart. In 1973 Dunhill released Rhodes' Farewell to Paradise. His musical style was so close to the Beatles and especially to Paul McCartney that some fans thought it was a Beatles record. "It was really flattering," Rhodes said. "Those guys were my idols."

Rhodes wrote all of the songs on his albums. On Emitt Rhodes, Mirror, and Farewell to Paradise, he played all of the instruments and sang all of the vocals while recording himself in his home recording studio. He used a four-track recorder for the instruments for Emitt Rhodes and transferred those to an eight-track recorder to add the vocals. He used an eight-track recorder for Mirror and Farewell to Paradise. The mixdown engineer on Farewell to Paradise was Curt Boettcher, the producer and musician who is best remembered for his work on the "soft pop" albums by Sagittarius and The Millennium.

Rhodes' contract with Dunhill called for an album every six months (six albums over three years) – a schedule that was impossible for Rhodes to meet, due to writing all of the songs and recording each instrument and vocal individually by himself. Dunhill sued Rhodes for $250,000 and withheld royalties because of his failure to deliver albums on the timescale required by the contract. Emitt Rhodes took nearly a year to record, the album Mirror took nine months, and Farewell to Paradise took over a year.

Later career
After Farewell to Paradise, Rhodes stopped performing and released no more material, except on compilations. He continued to record his songs in his studio, but they were unreleased except for the song "Isn't It So" on Listen, Listen. He worked as a recording engineer and record producer for Elektra Records. In 1978 Rhodes had begun work on a solo album for Elektra Records, but abandoned it after the A&R man he was working with was fired. In 2000 he had completed a solo album for the Rocktopia label, but the label was shut down before they could release it. He ran his own studio for recording other acts. Rhodes' song "Lullabye" (from Emitt Rhodes) was featured in the 2001 Wes Anderson film The Royal Tenenbaums. In January and February 2009, Italian director Cosimo Messeri shot a documentary movie about Rhodes' vicissitudes: life, past, present, troubles and hopes. The movie, titled The One Man Beatles, was selected for the International Rome Film Festival 2009, and it received standing ovations. In 2010 The One Man Beatles was nominated for David di Donatello Award as Best Documentary of 2010. Its US premiere screening was scheduled for May 29, 2010, at the Rhino Records Pop Up Store in Westwood, Los Angeles.

2010–11 recordings
In 2009, Rhodes' once again entered the recording studios with a new band and all-new material, joined by the co-founder of the Grass Roots and the Merry-Go-Round drummer Joel Larson, co-founder and former bassist for Counting Crows, Matt Malley, and guitarists Jim Rolfe and Dan Mayer.

In 2010, Rhodes, along with Matt Malley, joined Iain Matthews on a new version of "Time Will Show the Wiser", arranged, produced and performed by Nick Vernier Band. This recording, initially released on Nick Vernier Band's Sessions album, marked Rhodes' first new release as a featured artist in almost four decades. Both Rhodes and Matthews recorded this Rhodes original early on in their careers, the song being starting points as well as signature works for the Merry-Go-Round and Fairport Convention respectively. The new version united the two singers in an Indian musical setting. Also in 2010, a tribute album titled Long Time, No See was released. It contained Rhodes' songs recorded by various artists.

On November 3, 2011, Rhodes released three new songs on iTunes titled "Just Me And You", "What's A Man to Do" and "This Wall Between Us", featuring backup singing by Vicki and Debbi Peterson of The Bangles and guitar work by Richard Thompson. These were removed from sale shortly after release, by recording facility 201 Studios, due to litigation.

Rainbow Ends 
In 2014, Rhodes began work with musician/producer Chris Price on a full album of songs, recorded in his original home studio, intended as a stylistic follow-up to Farewell to Paradise. During these sessions, Rhodes recorded a cover of the Bee Gees hit "How Can You Mend a Broken Heart" for a tribute album called To Love the Bee Gees, released in November 2015 by 80 Proof Records and Tapes. On April 18, 2015, the recording was released as a limited edition 45 rpm single on red vinyl, as a Record Store Day exclusive. On November 12, 2015, the announcement was made that Rhodes' first album in 43 years was to be released on February 26, 2016, through Omnivore Recordings. The album is titled Rainbow Ends and is produced by Price. It features contributions from Roger Joseph Manning, Jr., Jason Falkner, Aimee Mann, Jon Brion, Susanna Hoffs, Nels Cline, Pat Sansone, Taylor Locke, Fernando Perdomo, Joe Seiders, Bleu, Probyn Gregory and Nelson Bragg.  The first single, "Dog On A Chain", featuring harmonies by Mann and a solo by Brion, was premiered by the Wall Street Journals blog Speakeasy. Rainbow Ends was released to favorable reviews, including 4 star reviews from MOJO Magazine, All Music Guide, American Songwriter and a highly favorable review in The Washington Post that said "in a better world [it] would have topped the charts in 1978 or so."

Death
Rhodes died in his sleep on July 19, 2020, in Hawthorne, California. The news was later confirmed by Tony Blass, who produced the film about Rhodes, The One Man Beatles. Blass commented that he was "honoured and blessed to have worked and spent time with him".

Rhodes had two sons from his first marriage to Kathy Sharp and one daughter with his second wife, Charnelle Smith. He was engaged to his partner of nine years, Valerie Eaton, at the time of his death.

Discography

Studio albums
with the Merry-Go-Round:
 The Merry-Go-Round by the Merry-Go-Round (1967), Billboard 200 No. 190

solo
 The American Dream (1970) No. 194
 Emitt Rhodes (1970) No. 29
 Mirror (1971) No. 182
 Farewell to Paradise (1973)
 Rainbow Ends (2016) No. 150

Singles
with the Merry-Go-Round:
 "Live" (1967) – US Billboard Hot 100 No. 63
 "Time Will Show the Wiser" (1967)
 "You're a Very Lovely Woman" – (1967) US Billboard Hot 100 No. 94
 "She Laughed Loud"
 "Listen, Listen"
 "'Til the Day After"

solo:
 "Fresh as a Daisy" (1970) US Billboard #54, AUS #69
 "You Take the Dark Out of the Night"
 "Live Till You Die" (1971) US Cashbox No. 103
 "With My Face on the Floor"
 "Love Will Stone You"
 "Really Wanted You" (1971) US Cashbox No. 108
 "Golden Child of God"
 "Tame The Lion" / "Those That Die" (1972) US Record World No. 138
 "Isn't It So?"
 "Just Me And You", "What's A Man To Do" / "This Wall Between Us" Released on iTunes, November 3, 2011 (removed from sale); Remixes released on iTunes, February 20, 2015.
 "How Can You Mend a Broken Heart" / with Chris Price "Please Read Me" B-side. Limited edition release for Record Store Day, April 18, 2015.

Collections
 Daisy-Fresh from Hawthorne, California (The Best of the Dunhill Years)
 Daisy-Fresh includes all of the songs from Emitt Rhodes, six songs from Mirror, four songs from Farewell to Paradise, plus the single "Tame the Lion". Released in 1998 by Edsel Records (EDCD 569).
 Listen, Listen: The Best of Emitt Rhodes
 Listen, Listen contains five songs from the Merry-Go-Round, one song from The American Dream, seven songs from Emitt Rhodes, four songs from Mirror, two songs from Farewell to Paradise, plus the single "Tame the Lion" and the previously-unreleased 1980 song "Isn't it So".  Released in 1995 by Varèse Sarabande – VSD-5612, Varèse Vintage (VSD-5612).
 The Merry-Go-Round: Listen, Listen: The Definitive Collection
 A nearly complete collection of Merry-Go-Round songs, almost all written and sung by Rhodes. The Merry-Go-Round (stereo version) and American Dream LPs are included in their entirety, as are the mono mix of "Time Will Show the Wiser" and a few non-album singles. Not included are the mono mix of The Merry-Go-Round and the unique single mixes of "Come Ride, Come Ride" and "'Til the Day After".  Released in 2005 by Rev-Ola (cr rev 110).
 Royal Tenenbaums: Collector's Edition CD
 "Lullabye" appears.
 The Emitt Rhodes Recordings (1969–1973)
 A two CD Collection released in 2009 by Hip-O Select, A&M Records, Geffen Records (B0012926-02):
 CD 1: The American Dream (all thirteen songs from both versions) and Emitt Rhodes
 CD 2: Mirror and Farewell to Paradise, plus the single "Tame the Lion"

References

Bibliography
 Emitt Rhodes: Recorded at Home, by Kevin Ryan, Tape Op No. 33, Jan. 2003, pp 44–50.
 Emitt Rhodes Song Book, published by Thirty Four Music Co., 1971

External links
  
 Emitt Rhodes Discography
 
 Website about Emitt Rhodes
Interview with James Eliopulos and Richard Derrick for Los Angeles Beat
 Interview with Rhodes by Kim Cooper and P. Edwin Letcher for Scram Magazine
 
 [ allmusic.com] – Artist profile of Emitt Rhodes.

1950 births
2020 deaths
Musicians from Decatur, Illinois
American multi-instrumentalists
American rock songwriters
American rock singers
A&M Records artists
Dunhill Records artists
Musicians from Hawthorne, California
Writers from Decatur, Illinois
Power pop musicians
Singer-songwriters from California
Singer-songwriters from Illinois
One-man bands